Oswald Freisler (29 December 1895 in Hamelin – 4 March 1939 in Berlin) was a lawyer in Nazi Germany and the brother of the Judge President of the People's Court, Roland Freisler.

Life
Freisler attended the Gymnasium in Aachen and Kassel, where in 1914 he passed his Abitur. He studied law in Kiel, Frankfurt and Göttingen.  In February 1924, he opened a law firm with his brother Roland Freisler in Kassel.  Oswald Freisler joined the Nazi Party in 1927 and was a member of the National Socialist Association of Legal Professionals. From 1933, he was Gauführer in Kassel and a member of the Academy for German Law, and in the same year he became president of the bar association in Kassel. In 1936, he took over the Berlin office of Jewish lawyer Johannes Werthauer, who left Germany in 1933 in order to teach at the Sorbonne.

Although a Nazi, Freisler appeared as defence counsel in politically significant trials which the Nazis sought to use for propaganda purposes. He wore his Nazi Party badge in court, which led to confusion over the Party's role in the trials. In 1937, on behalf of the Catholic Church, Freisler took over the defence of three co-defendants in the trial of Joseph C. Rossaint, a resistance fighter against National Socialism, and won an acquittal, much to the displeasure of the Nazi Party. In response, Joseph Goebbels asked Adolf Hitler to personally exclude Freisler from the party.  On 30 April 1937, Goebbels observed with satisfaction, "Freisler expelled from the party by the Führer."

In 1939, Freisler mysteriously committed suicide in Berlin after he had been accused of irregularities in the conduct of a defence. There are three versions of Freisler's death. One is that he defenestrated himself from his office, another is that the incident occurred in prison, and the third version is that he injected himself with an overdose of insulin.

Publications
 Das System der Ehrenstrafen in der deutschen Vergangenheit und im geltenden Recht und die Frage nach seiner Existenzberechtigung. Göttingen [1921], Law and political science dissertation from 1 November 1920

References

Bibliography
 Gert Buchheit. Richter in roter Robe. Freisler, Präsident des Volksgerichtshofes. München: List, 1968; p. 12–13, 276–278
 Short biography in: Werner Schubert, Werner Schmid, Jürgen Regge. Akademie für deutsches Recht, 1933–1945: Protokolle der Ausschüsse; Band 3, Familienrechtsausschuss, p. 43

1895 births
1939 suicides
Jurists from Lower Saxony
Lawyers in the Nazi Party
Members of the Academy for German Law
Nazis who committed suicide in Germany
People from Hamelin
People from Kassel
Roland Freisler